The 2013 Quebec City municipal election took place on November 3, 2013, to elect a mayor and city councillors in Quebec City, Quebec, Canada. The election is in conjunction with 2013 Quebec municipal elections to be held across the province on the same date.

Quebec City Council voted to reduce the number of councillors from 27 to 21 in time for the 2013 municipal election.

Results

Mayor

City councillors

La Cité-Limoilou

Les Rivières

Sainte-Foy–Sillery–Cap-Rouge

Charlesbourg

Beauport

La Haute-Saint-Charles

References

External links
Ville de Québec Élections municipales 

Quebec City
2013
2010s in Quebec City